Hassoun Camara (born 3 February 1986) is a French former professional footballer of Senegalese descent.

Career

France 
Camara began his career with his hometown club, Olympique Noisy-le-Sec, appearing in 67 matches and scoring 1 goal. He signed his first full professional contract with Olympique de Marseille in 2006; however, after a few months with the Provence club, he was unable to overtake incumbent starter Habib Beye and in search of playing time, he signed a three-year contract with Ligue 2 club SC Bastia, playing primarily as a rightback or centerback. He had his most productive season during the 2008–09 Ligue 2 season with 26 appearances and three goals. He scored his first goal as a professional on 22 February 2008, against Libourne Saint-Seurin. The following season, he fell out of favor with the club and terminated his contract with Bastia on 18 January 2010.

Canada 
On 7 February 2011, Camara signed with the Montreal Impact of the North American Soccer League. In his first season with Montreal Camara appeared in 22 league matches and scored 2 goals as he was named the club's most valuable player. After a successful first season with Montreal, in which he was regarded as one of the top players in the North American Soccer League, Camara re-signed with Montreal Impact on 11 October 2011 for the club's inaugural 2012 season in Major League Soccer. On 29 May 2013 he scored the cup-winning goal for the Montreal Impact in the Canadian Championship final against the Vancouver Whitecaps; this goal allowed the Montreal Impact to qualify for the CONCACAF Champions League for the second time in the team's history.

On 11 June 2014, he played his hundredth match all competitions for the Montreal Impact against D.C. United.

Camara was released by Montreal on 16 November 2017. He announced his retirement from professional soccer on December 12, 2017, citing an accumulation of injuries.

Career statistics

Club

Honours

Club 
Montreal Impact
Canadian Championship (2): 2013, 2014

References

External links 
 
 lequipe.fr
 
avebastia.free.fr

1986 births
Living people
French footballers
French expatriate footballers
French sportspeople of Senegalese descent
French expatriate sportspeople in Canada
Olympique Noisy-le-Sec players
Olympique de Marseille players
SC Bastia players
Montreal Impact (1992–2011) players
CF Montréal players
FC Montreal players
Expatriate soccer players in Canada
Ligue 2 players
North American Soccer League players
Major League Soccer players
Association football fullbacks